Tegan the Vegan is a 2011 stop-motion animation short film directed by Marisa Martin and starring Charli Robinson (then referred to as Delaney), Noni Hazlehurst, Paul McDermott and Pippa Black. It is produced by Enemies of Reality media, based in Queanbeyan, New South Wales, and voice recording was completed in Sydney and Melbourne.

Plot

The film is about Tegan, a 12-year-old student who finds out where meat comes from, and decides to become a vegetarian.  She must contend with Elenore the Carnivore. The plot is based partly on the experience of the director, Marisa Martin, who became a vegetarian when she was 12 after visiting an abattoir.

Cast
Charli Robinson as Tegan the Vegan
Noni Hazlehurst as Mrs Poodle & Tegan's Mum
Paul McDermott as Trent, Dorian and Bryan
Pippa Black as Elenore the Carnivore
Belinda Barancewicz as Suki

Production
The puppets were made using aluminium foil, epoxy putty, polymer clay, foam and magnets (in the feet to help them stay up). Filming the puppets was a long process, taking around a week to make six seconds of film.

Themes
vegetarianism
young love

References

2011 films
Australian animated short films
2010s English-language films
2010s Australian films